Death and Company (sometimes stylized as Death & Co.) is a cocktail bar located in East Village, Manhattan, New York, United States. Established in January 2007, the bar is owned by David Kaplan and Ravi DeRossi.

The bar is known for its lengthy cocktail menu, which contained about 50 selections prior to late 2016, when the list was shortened to 30. The bar helped lead the craft cocktail movement.

In 2016, the company announced it was opening a branch in the Ramble Hotel in Denver, Colorado. Plans to open in Seattle were announced in 2023.

Further reading

References

External links
 

Drinking establishments in Manhattan
East Village, Manhattan
Speakeasies